Ahmad Reza Djalali (born 15 September 1971) is an Iranian-Swedish disaster medicine doctor, lecturer, and researcher. He was accused of espionage and collaboration with Israel and sentenced to death. He has worked in several universities in Europe, among which Karolinska University of Sweden, where he had also attended his PhD program, Università degli Studi del Piemonte Orientale (Italy), Vrije Universiteit Brussel (Belgium). He also cooperated with universities in Iran and is in contact with universities worldwide.

Djalali was arrested in April 2016 in Iran and sentenced to death on the charges of espionage and treason, in what human rights organizations said to be "a grossly unfair trial." According to Djalali, he has been tortured and threatened during the period of his arrest.

Academic work 
Djalali's academic work in the field of disaster medicine has looked at issues related to emergency medicine in a range of contexts, such as Italy, Denmark, Sweden and Iran and has over 700 citations. He was a key figure in establishing the Università del Piemonte Orientale (CRIMEDIM) Research Center in Emergency and Disaster in Italy and has been part of important studies on the level of preparedness of hospitals for disasters. Published studies he co-authored have also looked at hospital preparedness for earthquakes, man-made conflicts, Chemical, biological, radiological, and nuclear (CBRN) emergencies and massive influxes of emergency patients. A 2016 study looked at the preparedness level of Emergency Departments of Italian hospitals by assessing the knowledge-base of emergency physicians on basic disaster planning and procedures. The study found a need to enhance staff disaster preparedness education, training and follow-up to ensure understanding and awareness of Emergency Plans. He has also contributed to the development of curricula for post-graduate courses on disaster medicine for undergraduates  and postgraduates.

In December 2020 he was offered a fellowship by Harvard, following his acceptance into the BIDMC Fellowship in Disaster Medicine. The position at BIDMC includes an academic appointment as a Research Fellow at Harvard Medical School. In the award letter, Gregory R. Ciottone, Director of the Division of Disaster Medicine, described Djalali as “a strong academician and leader. As a Disaster Medicine fellow, you will represent all of us through your academic diligence, professionalism, and conduct.”

Arrest and imprisonment
In April 2016, when he was visiting Iran, following an invitation from the University of Tehran and Shiraz University, he was arrested upon order of the Ministry of Intelligence and Security, without a reason for arrest. Two weeks later he was charged of espionage and collaboration with Israel, the proof being an alleged letter from his spouse, which was said to contain evidence of the accusations. His family was not informed on his whereabouts for ten days, though they knew he had been arrested. After being held at an unknown location for approximately seven days, he was transferred to section 209 of Evin prison, where he was held for seven months. During the calls made to his family, Djalali said he had been held in solitary confinement for three months, and the following months in partial isolation.

Sentence 
On 31 January 2017, after nine months of detention, Djalali was taken to branch 15 of the Revolutionary Court in Tehran where he was formally charged with espionage and was told that he could face a death penalty. Reportedly, his lawyer was not allowed to be present at the hearing and he was denied access to the case files.

Djalali was sentenced to death on 21 October 2017, on the charge of “corruption on earth” (ifsad fil-arz). He was then incarcerated at Evin prison. In November 2017, the United Nations Working Group on Arbitrary Detention formally requested the Iranian Government to provide detailed information about his detention, but it did not receive a response. In late 2017, an Iranian state TV presented him as a spy and showed his alleged confession which, according to Djalali, was a pre-written text that he was forced to say under threats of execution, and even of harming his loved ones. Attempts by his lawyer to submit appeals for judicial review of the sentence have been rejected.

In November 2020, Djalali was transferred to solitary confinement in Evin prison. Prosecution authorities informed Amnesty International that Djalali's death sentence was now a matter of weeks from 24 November and would be carried out imminently. UN rights experts called on Iranian authorities to quash the death sentence of Djalali. Amnesty urged members of the international community to intervene immediately into the matter to halt the execution.

Health condition 
Djalali's health condition has reportedly been deteriorating since his arrest. In particular, blood tests run in 2018 indicated a low white blood cell count. Subsequently, he was examined by a medical doctor in early 2019 at Evin Prison; he was recommended to be seen by a specialist in haematology in hospital, but this request was denied. The recommended follow-up examinations have not been done. Reportedly, Djalali has lost 24 kg since the time of his arrest. The World Medical Association has taken up his case and its president, Ketan Desai, wrote to the Iranian authorities saying that the conditions under which Djalali is being held contravene medical ethics and human rights law.

International pressure

United Nations 
In November 2017, the United Nations Working Group on Arbitrary Detention formally requested the Iranian Government to provide detailed information about his detention and it did not receive a response. On 9 February 2018, United Nations human rights experts urgently called on Iran to lift the death sentence against Djalali.

United Nations human rights experts appealed to Iran to annul the death sentence against Djalali for the first time during 2017. The experts were José Antonio Guevara Bermúdez, Chair-Rapporteur of the Working Group on Arbitrary Detention; Nils Melzer, Special Rapporteur on torture and other cruel, inhuman or degrading treatment or punishment; Agnes Callamard, Special Rapporteur on extrajudicial, summary or arbitrary executions; and Asma Jahangir, Special Rapporteur on the situation of human rights in the Islamic Republic of Iran.

They adopted the opinion No. 92/2017. On 18 September 2017, the Working Group transmitted allegations to the Government under its regular communications procedure but did not receive a response from the Iranian Government. This document argued that the deprivation of liberty of Djalali was in contravention of articles 3, 5, 8, 9, 10 and 11 of the Universal Declaration of Human Rights and of articles 7, 9, 10 and 14 of the International Covenant on Civil and Political Rights and it states that Djalali should be released and accorded a right to compensation and other reparations, in accordance with international law. United Nations human rights experts repeated their urgent call in 2018.

In the 2020 Annual report of the United Nations High Commissioner for Human Rights and reports of the Office of the High Commissioner and the Secretary-General, it is stated that "There are persistent concerns about the situation of dual and foreign nationals who remain imprisoned in the Islamic Republic of Iran [...]. Iranian-Swedish citizen Ahmadreza Djalali, sentenced to death in October 2017 on espionage charges, was reportedly transferred on 29 July 2019 to an unknown location for approximately 10 days before being returned to Evin Prison. During that time, he was reportedly pressured to confess to further allegations. Djalali, along with other dual and foreign nationals, including Mr. Ghaderi, have been denied medical treatment, notably for life-threatening conditions."

In the Report of the Special Rapporteur on the situation of human rights in the Islamic Republic of Iran 2020, it is underlined that "the security and intelligence officials, including the Ministry of Intelligence and the Islamic Revolutionary Guard Corps, have in many cases prevented access to medical care for detainees and prisoners, or made medical attention or transfers to hospital conditional upon confession." In addition, the Special Rapporteur is concerned about the practice of publicizing forced confession: "Ahmadreza Djalali, a Swedish-Iranian academic, had his confession to spying on the Islamic Republic of Iran broadcast on State television in December 2017, five days after the Supreme Court had upheld his death sentence through a hastily convened and secret process during which no submissions from the defence had been allowed". It is reported Djalali recorded the confession under duress, after his interrogators had said that he would be released from solitary confinement only if he recorded the confession.

On 6 October 2020, the UN High Commissioner for Human Rights Michelle Bachelet expressed deep concern at the deteriorating situation of human rights defenders, lawyers, and political prisoners being held in Iran's prisons. She called on the authorities to release them in the context of the COVID-19 pandemic pointing to the spread of disease in the country and unsanitary conditions within the prisons.

On 18 March 2021 UN human rights experts demanded his immediate release as his condition has become critical. The experts said “Djalali’s situation is truly horrific. He has been held in prolonged solitary confinement for over 100 days with the constant risk of his imminent execution laying over his head,” and he is being deprived of sleep by prison officials shining lights on him 24 hours a day.

Nobel Laureates 
In December 2018, 121 Nobel Laureates wrote an open letter to Iranian Supreme Leader Ayatollah Ali Khamenei to provide medical assistance for Djalali and ask for his release. In November 2020, following news of professor Djalali's imminent execution, 153 Nobel Laureates sent another letter to the Ayatollah calling for his release.

European Parliament 
In 2019, the European Parliament adopted a resolution demanding that Djalali and four other EU citizens detained be released. MEPs demanded the immediate release of all EU-Iranian dual nationals, including Nazanin Zaghari-Ratcliffe (British), Ahmadreza Djalali (Swedish) and Kamran Ghaderi (Austrian), detained in Iranian prisons, unless they are retried according to international standards. On 17 December 2020 the European Parliament adopted a resolution (2020/2914(RSP)) which calls on Iran to quash his death sentence and secure his immediate release, as well as that of Nasrin Sotoudeh, woman human rights defender and lawyer.

Amnesty International 
Amnesty International has been closely following and collecting the information about Djalali's living conditions and health status, especially the living conditions Djalali has experienced during his imprisonment.

In 2017, Amnesty International has launched the campaign to encourage public audiences to write a petition letter and submit to Iranian Supreme Leader Office, President of Iran, and Chief Justice of Iran (head of the Judiciary), to ask for an immediate release of Djalali, and a proper health medication, to ensure Djalali's safety, and his accessibility to lawyer and family, including the Swedish consular to meet him.

The 2020 Nowruz Action is a campaign to support prisoners of conscience in Iran on the occasion of Iranian traditional new year festival. Amnesty encourages public audiences to send supporting messages to the prisoners and their families. Amnesty International selected seven cases of political prisoners and academic prisoners, among which was Djalali's case, to represent the Nowruz campaign.

Scholars at Risk 
Scholars at Risk (SAR) is an international network of institutions and individuals to promote academic freedom and protect scholars from academic freedom threats. SAR has been engaging and pushing public campaigns to support Djalali, for example, by releasing letters to public authorities in Iran and conducting online activities via social networks. In January 2018, SAR published the campaign ‘#SaveAhmad’ through social media to exert pressures to public institutions to support Djalali's release. In March 2020, in response to the COVID-19 pandemic, SAR issued the letter to Iranian authorities to unconditionally release Djalali because of his health conditions.

Swedish academic institutions 
Between 13 and 16 academic institutions in Sweden continued to pursue partnerships and exchange programs with Iranian counterparts after Iranian authorities had condemned Djalali to death. Simultaneously, some also pleaded for Iran to release Djalali. The institutions which pursued partnerships with Iranian institutions 2018 or later were:

 Lund University
 Chalmers University of Technology
 Linnaeus University
 Malmö University
 KTH Royal Institute of Technology
 University of Borås
 Halmstad University
 University of Gothenburg
 Mälardalen University College
 Luleå University of Technology
 Jönköping University
 Gävle University College
 University of Skövde

European universities 

On 31 October 2017, the Università degli studi del Piemonte Orientale, the Karolinska University and the Vrije Universiteit Brussel sent a letter to the head of the judiciary of Iran, Sadegh Larijani asking for Djalali's immediate release. In the letter the universities recalled the excellent reputation of Djalali recalled the right to freedom of expression.

In November 2017, European University Association (EUA) put pressure on Iranian authorities for a reversal of Djalali's capital sentence and his instant release. The EUA wrote a letter to Iranian Supreme Leader, and expressed grave concerns about the ongoing harm to Djalali and his family.

In April 2018, Flemish University Council (VLIR) decided to postpone all academic cooperation with Iranian universities and institutions in response to Iranian authorities’ decision to imprison and lay down death sentences over Djalali, a professor of Brussel Free University. On this occasion, the Council expressed deep concerns about the professor's imprisonment and requested the Iranian authorities to provide him medical care.

Following news of Djalali's imminent execution in December 2020, Scholars at Risk mobilized universities across the world to call for a halt to his execution. The Italian conference of rectors sent a petition to the Ayatollah Khamenei to secure this release.

The University of Piemonte Orientale and CRIMEDIM organized a 24-hour scientific and academic marathon on 9 December which involved more than 260 speakers from 23 countries in 5 continents and had thousands of viewers.

Case update

2017 
 A petition was started for the release of Djalali on change.org and it succeeded in obtaining more than 320.000 signatures. The petition was directed to Iranian Authorities and to the former President of the European Parliament Antonio Tajani, among others.
 On 31 October, the Università degli studi del Piemonte, the Karolinska University and the Vrije Universitet Brussel sent a letter to the Head of the judiciary of Iran, Ayatollah Sadegh Larijani asking for Djalali's immediate release. In the letter the universities recalled the excellent reputation of Djalali and recalled the right to the freedom of expression.
 On 13 November, the European University Association sent a letter to Supreme Leader of the Islamic Republic of Iran, Ayatollah Ali Khamenei.
 The Human Rights Council Working Group on Arbitrary Detention (UN) adopted opinion No. 92/2017 at its eightieth session, 20–24 November. The Working Group transmitted the source's allegations to the Iranian Government and requested the Government to provide, by 17 November, detailed information about the current situation of Djalali and any comments on the source's allegations. The opinion received no feedback.

2018 
 The Human Rights Council Working Group on Arbitrary Detention (UN) repeated their urgent call for Djalali's release.
In February Ahmadreza Djalali was granted permanent Swedish citizenship.
 On 5 February, FIDU (Federazione Italiana Diritti Umani), Iran Human Rights, ECPM – Ensemble Contre la Peine de Mort and Nessuno tocchi Caino (Hands off Caino) sent a letter to the High Representative of the Union for Foreign Affairs and Security Policy Federica Mogherini in order to ask to take urgent action and to obtain an immediate suspension of the death sentence.
 On 3 May, the Scholars At Risk network wrote a letter to the Supreme Leader of the Islamic Republic of Iran, Ayatollah Ali Khamenei.

2019 
 On 24 January the Committee of Concerned Scientists (ССS), an independent organization of scientists, physicians, engineers and scholars, wrote to The Acting Minister of Health and Medical Education in Iran, Dr. Saeed Namaki. The letter requested Djalali be taken to a community hospital for appropriate care. On 17 March 2020, ССS also suggested freeing Djalali to aid in COVID-19 pandemic. Addressing the Supreme Leader of Iran, Ayatollah Ali Khamenei, CSS stated: “Iran could greatly benefit from utilizing the expertise of Dr. Ahmadreza Djalali who is an internationally recognized leader in the area of disaster medicine. His contribution to the fight against the pandemic would be invaluable for your country.” In February 2021 ССS also requested President Biden arrange the release of Djalali and vacate his sentence.
 On 9 September Prof Dr Peter-André Alt, President of the German Rectors’ Conference (HRK) wrote an open letter reiterating his call for the immediate release of Djalali. Alt stated: “The death sentence and relentless cruel treatment of Dr Djalali constitute a terrible violation of human rights and academic freedom. The global scientific community cannot tolerate the actions of the Iranian Government.”

2020
 After the widespread of the COVID-19 pandemic, in March 2020, Iranian authorities released 85,000 individuals from prisons, including political prisoners. Djalali was not among this number.
 In June Stefania Pucciarelli, Senator of the Italian Republic and President of the Human Rights Commission of Palazzo Madama, wrote a letter to the ambassador of Iran for an update on Djalali.
 In June a guest editorial written by Physician Frederick M. Burkle and featured in the World Association for Disaster and Emergency Medicine's June issue of Prehospital and Disaster Medicine discusses Djalali's case and urges for his immediate release. Burkle stated, “Whatever political advantage Iran thought they might gain by his incarceration has had the opposite effect to what was intended. Upon his death, academic institutions world-wide, that support the over 70,000 Iranian graduate students and scholars studying abroad each year, will be increasingly reluctant to participate for fear those graduates will suffer a similar fate once they return.”
 In September, an interview from prison was released where Ahmadreza Djalali calls on the Swedish government to intervene to help free him.
 10 October was the World Day against the Death Penalty and Amnesty and other organizations tweeted calls to save Djalali.
 In October 2020, UN High Commissioner for Human Rights Michelle Bachelet expressed deep concern at the deteriorating situation of human rights defenders, lawyers, and political prisoners being held in Iran's prisons.
On 24 November, it was widely reported that Djalali had been transferred to solitary confinement and had been told by the authorities that his death sentence would soon be carried out.
On Tuesday, 1 December the organization Iran Human Rights reported hearing from Vida Mehrannia, Djalali's wife, that he was going to be transferred to Rajai Shahr prison, a normal preliminary to an execution. This was just a few days after the release of the Australian scholar Kylie Moore-Gilbert.
On Wednesday, 2 December, Djalali was granted a temporary reprieve and was not transferred to Rajai Shahr prison, as reported by The Guardian.

2021 
 On March 1, 2021, a group of civil rights activists appeared before the Judiciary Services Office in Tehran to file a suit against those who order or enforce solitary confinement in Iran's detention centres and prisons, bringing to the fore public discussion in Iran of a longstanding practice that the UN has labelled torture.
On 18 March 2021, UN human rights experts demanded the immediate release of Djalali due to his critical condition after over 100 days in solitary confinement, a form of punishment used systematically by the Islamic Republic of Iran despite being a violation of Iran's obligations under the International Covenant on Civil and Political Rights.

2022 

 The Iranian Students News Agency reports that Djalali will be executed on 21 May "at the latest." Tehran has denied any links between the Trial of Hamid Nouri and Ahmad Reza Djalali's death sentence.
 According to research by Amnesty International, since Asadollah Asadi's trial in Belgium, Ahmadreza Djalali's situation has become a "hostage-taking".
 On 21 May 2022, Djalali's attorney Helaleh Moussavian told AFP that his defense team had requested a retrial from the judicial authority.
 Iran’s Intelligence Minister Esmaeil Khatib said that Djalali's "espionage for the Zionist regime has been proven and his death sentence has gone through all judicial stages."
 In June 2022, Private Eye explained that Iran appeared to be holding Djalali as a hostage in a vain attempt to secure the release of Hamid Nouri, a former prosecutor in Iran accused of involvement in 5,000 political executions in the 1980s.

See also 
 Niloufar Bayani
 Scholars at Risk
 List of foreign nationals detained in Iran

References

External links
 
 Letter from EUA calling for release
 SAR Case Information on Djalali
 Human Rights in Iran (UN page)
 International Observatory of Human Rights Video on the case

1971 births
Living people
People from Sarab, East Azerbaijan
Iranian prisoners sentenced to death
Iranian emigrants to Sweden
Inmates of Evin Prison
People convicted of spying for Israel
Prisoners sentenced to death by Iran
University of Eastern Piedmont alumni
Karolinska Institute alumni
Vrije Universiteit Brussel alumni
Iran–Israel proxy conflict